The 1942 experimental cents were pattern coins struck by the United States Mint to test alternative compositions for the penny.

History 
After the outbreak of World War II, the demand for copper rose as it was used in ammunition and other military equipment.  The US Mint researched ways to reduce or eliminate the usage of copper in cent production.  The mint struck pattern coins in various metals, using the obverse design of the Colombian two centavo coin.  Dies were sent to various companies to test possible non-metal compositions.  Patterns were also struck with modified rim Lincoln cent dies.

One of the compositions tested, zinc-coated steel, was chosen for the 1943 cent.

Compositions

Colombian patterns

Lincoln patterns

See also 

 Silver center cent
 Ring cent
 1943 steel cent
 1974 aluminum cent

References 

One-cent coins of the United States
1942 introductions